.32 ACP (Automatic Colt Pistol, also known as .32 Automatic) is a centerfire pistol cartridge. It is a semi-rimmed, straight-walled cartridge developed by firearms designer John Browning, initially for use in the FN M1900 semi-automatic pistol. It was introduced in 1899 by Fabrique Nationale, and is also known as the 7.65×17mmSR Browning or 7.65 mm Browning Short.

History
John Browning engineered a number of modern semi-automatic pistol mechanisms and cartridges. As his first pistol cartridge, the .32 ACP needed a straight wall for reliable blowback operation as well as a small rim for reliable feeding from a box magazine. The cartridge headspaces on the rim. The cartridge was a success and was adopted by dozens of countries and many governmental agencies.

When the .32 ACP cartridge was introduced, it was immediately popular and was available in several blowback automatic pistols of the day, including the Colt Model 1903 Pocket Hammerless, the Savage Model 1907 automatic pistol, the Ruby pistol and the Browning Model 1910 automatic pistol. The popularity of the .32 ACP in the early half of the 20th century cannot be overstated—especially in Europe. Firearms expert Geoffrey Boothroyd, of the UK, informed author Ian Fleming, his countryman, that James Bond's sidearm should be a Walther PPK chambered in .32 ACP. A significant factor in recommending this round was its availability throughout the world in the 1950s.

The .32 ACP has been chambered in more handguns than any other cartridge. Between 1899 and 1909, Fabrique Nationale produced 500,000 guns chambered for .32 ACP.

Heckler & Koch produced the HK 4, their first handgun, in 1967. Twelve thousand HK 4 pistols were produced in .32 ACP for the German police and other government agencies.

Several long guns have been chambered in .32 ACP, from the Tirmax and Dreyse carbines to the AR-15-style Armi Jager AP-74.

Design
The .32 ACP was intended for blowback semi-automatic pistols, which lack breech locking mechanisms. It was John Pedersen with the Remington Model 51 that delivered a true locked breech for the .32 ACP cartridge. The low power and light bullet of the cartridge allowed Browning to incorporate a practical blowback mechanism in a small pocket-size pistol. It is still used today, primarily in compact, inexpensive pistols, unless the pistol is used for ISSF competition, where the cost then escalates. Cartridges in .32 ACP are also sometimes used in caliber conversion sleeves, also known as supplemental chambers, for providing an alternative pistol caliber carbine function in .30-caliber hunting and service rifles.

Some comparison of the .32 Automatic as defined by SAAMI and the 7.65 Browning as defined by CIP may be useful. Although some of the cartridge measurements differ by as much as 0.16 mm, the names are considered to be synonymous. This may explain why the cartridges from European manufacturers tend to chronograph at higher muzzle velocities than those from American manufacturers.

Performance

The .32 ACP is compact and light. While some believe it has marginal stopping power, it has been used effectively by military and police worldwide for the past century. Although .32 ACP handguns were traditionally made of steel, they have been produced in lightweight polymers since the 1990s. Their light weight, very low recoil and very good accuracy relative to larger caliber pistols make them suitable for concealed carry use. Some popular pistols chambered in .32 ACP are the Walther PP and the Walther PPK as well as the FEG PA-63, which is a clone of the Walther PP.

It offers more velocity and energy than the .32 S&W, which was a popular round for pocket defensive revolvers at the time of the .32 ACP's development. Although with lighter bullet weights, the .32 ACP also compares favorably to the .32 S&W Long in performance. Some European 73-grain .32 ACP loads provide similar performance to the .32 H&R Magnum 77-grain lead flat point and 90-grain lead semiwadcutter.

Even though the .32 ACP is capable of killing small game, most handguns chambered for this round utilize fixed sights and are designed for use against human-sized targets at fairly close range, which greatly limits their utility as hunting handguns.

.32 ACP is one of the most common calibers used in veterinary "humane killers", such as the Greener humane killer.

In Europe, where the round is commonly known as the 7.65mm Browning and features a different rimsizing, .32 ACP has always been more widely accepted than it has in America, having a long history of use by civilians, law enforcement personnel, and security forces, along with limited issue by military forces. During the second half of the 20th century, several European countries developed firearms for police, chambered in 9×18mm Makarov while chambering the same pistol for civilians in .32 ACP and .380 ACP. Examples include the Vz. 82/CZ-83 from Czechoslovakia, FEG PA-63/AP 765 from Hungary, SIG Sauer P230 from Switzerland, and P-83 Wanad from Poland.

Today the cartridge has an increased popularity in the United States due to modern compact concealed carry pistols chambered for it, such as the Kel-Tec P-32, Beretta Tomcat, Seecamp LWS 32 and North American Arms Guardian .32. This increase in popularity has led many ammunition manufacturers to develop new loads for the cartridge to increase performance. However, these subcompact guns typically have barrel lengths around 2.5 inches. The traditional steel guns chambered for .32 ACP have barrel lengths around 3.5 inches. Different barrel lengths can have a significant effect on bullet performance with longer barrels providing higher muzzle velocity and energy. For example, a Cor-Bon 60-grain .32 ACP JHP has 130 foot pounds of energy when fired out of a 2.5-inch barrel and 165 foot pounds of energy when fired out of a 3.5-inch barrel. A shorter barrel length can also reduce the range of a bullet.

Gallery

Synonyms

 .32 Auto (typical designation in America)
 .32 Browning Auto
 .32 Rimless Smokeless (Used on early pistols chambered for it)
 7.65 mm Browning (typical designation in Europe)
 7.65×17mm
 7.65×17mm Browning SR (SR = Semi-Rimmed)
 7.65 Walther

Prominent firearms chambered in .32 ACP

 Astra A-60
 Bayard 1908
 Beretta 3032 Tomcat
 Beretta M1915
 Beretta M1935
 Beretta Model 70
 Beretta Model 81 and 82
 Beretta Model 90
 Bersa 84 (Lusber)
 Bersa Thunder 32
 Colt Model 1903 Pocket Hammerless
 CZ-27 (Vz. 27)
 CZ-50
 CZ-70
 CZ-83
 CZ Škorpion Vz. 61 Machine pistol
 Dreyse M1907
 Erma KGP-68A "Baby Luger"
 FÉG 37M Pistol
 FÉG AP 765 Pistol
 FÉG Frommer Stop
 FN M1900
 FN Model 1910 and 1910/22
 Hamada Type pistol
 Heckler & Koch HK 4 P11
 Heckler & Koch HK P7K3
 Jieffeco Model 1911
 Kel-Tec P-32
 Llama Bufalo/Danton/Llama I/Llama X-A
 MAB Model D
 Mauser HSc
 Mauser Model 1914
 Mauser Model 1934
 Ortgies Semi-Automatic Pistol
 Oznobischev 1925
 Pardini HP
 Radom P-83 Wanad
 Remington 51
 Romanian Pistol Carpați Md. 1974
 Ruby
 Sauer 38H
 Savage Model 1907
 Seecamp LWS 32
 SIG Sauer P230
 Star Izarra
 Star Model 1914/1919
 Star SIS
 Steyr-Pieper Model 1908/34
 Taurus Millennium PT132
 Taurus TCP 732
 Taurus PT57
 Walther PP
 Walther PPK
 Webley & Scott M1905-M1908
 Welrod
 Zastava M70

See also
 .32 NAA
 7 mm caliber for other cartridges of similar diameter (7.0 - 7.99 mm diameter)
 List of handgun cartridges
 Table of handgun and rifle cartridges

Notes

References

External links
 Is The .32 Mission Feasible? 
 Ballistics 101 .32 ACP Ballistics Chart
 Ballistics By The Inch .32 ACP Results
 Brass Fetcher .32 ACP Gelatin Tests
 Golden Loki .32 ACP Gelatin Tests (Archived)
 Mouse Gun Addict Ammo Tests

1899 establishments in the United States
32 ACP
.32 ACP firearms
Colt cartridges